Lauritz Vilhelm Pacht (23 November 1843 – 20 May 1912) was a Danish genre painter, industrialist and philanthropist.

Biography
Pacht was born in Copenhagen, Denmark. He was the son of Lauritz Adolph Pacht (1819–68) and Eleonora Wilhelmine Hansen (1827–57). His father was a cap maker. After his confirmation, he began to learn printing, but was later apprenticed to a marble chipper. While taking classes at the Copenhagen Technical College, his drawings attracted the attention of G.F. Hetsch (1788–1864, who advised him to take up porcelain painting. After completing his courses, he was given a position at the Royal Porcelain Factory, which he held from 1862 to 1867.

Beginning in 1861, he also attended classes at the Royal Danish Academy of Fine Arts; passing his final exam in 1866. He began to have showings at the Charlottenborg Spring Exhibition and in 1869  was awarded the  Neuhausenske Prize (De Neuhausenske Præmier)
 
For several years, he worked to perfect a method to improve the reproduction of drawings by printing press. In 1872, he received a patent for his processes and set up a workshop for what he called the "Heliotype" (a process similar to hectography). Later, he also produced phototypes.

In 1880, he joined with the photographer, to create "Pacht & Crones Illustrationsetablissement". Pacht  left the company in 1885 and was replaced by the drawing teacher, . That same year, Pacht started the "Skandinavisk Panoptikon", a combination wax museum and cabinet of curiosities.

In 1887, he opened a factory that produced intaglio ink and paint tubes. In 1890, the company went public as an aktieselskab  called the "Danske Bogtrykkeres Farvefabrik", but he continued as General Manager.

In 1896, he presented the first moving pictures in Denmark in a wooden structure called the "Panorama" at the square in front of Copenhagen City Hall. His building and equipment were lost to a suspicious fire, but he soon re-established his shows (renamed the "Kineoptikon") at his Panoptikon.
 
His activities made him a wealthy man, but also ensured that his output as a painter was rather small.

He died  in 1912 at Holte.

References

External links 

ArtNet: More works by Pacht.

1843 births
1912 deaths
19th-century Danish painters
Danish male painters
Royal Danish Academy of Fine Arts alumni
Danish businesspeople
Danish printers
Porcelain painters
Entertainment industry businesspeople
19th-century Danish male artists